The 2000 Kent State Golden Flashes football team was an American football team that represented Kent State University in the Mid-American Conference (MAC) during the 2000 NCAA Division I-A football season. In their third season under head coach Dean Pees, the Golden Flashes compiled a 1–10 record (1–7 against MAC opponents), finished in last place in the MAC East, and were outscored by all opponents by a combined total of 359 to 128.

The team's statistical leaders included Chante Murphy with 800 rushing yards, Zach Williams with 1,120 passing yards, and Matt Curry with 511 receiving yards.

Schedule

References

Kent State
Kent State Golden Flashes football seasons
Kent State Golden Flashes football